Naphthanthrone is an organic carbon based molecule formed of five rings, of which four are benzene rings, joined in the shape of the Olympic rings.

The compound can be synthesized by the condensation of pyrene and glycerol in sulfuric acid. Its crystals belong to the orthorhombic crystal system.

See also
 Olympicene

References

Ketones
Polycyclic aromatic compounds